Home Federal Building is a historic bank building located at Charlotte, Mecklenburg County, North Carolina. It was built in 1967, and is a seven-story, reinforced-concrete, International Style building with an eight-story concrete-block service tower.  Also on the property are a contributing fountain and pool (1967) and walkway bridge (1967). The building has been converted to condominiums.

It was added to the National Register of Historic Places in 2008.

References

Bank buildings on the National Register of Historic Places in North Carolina
International style architecture in North Carolina
Commercial buildings completed in 1967
Buildings and structures in Charlotte, North Carolina
National Register of Historic Places in Mecklenburg County, North Carolina